Euan Spark (born 29 November 1996) is a Scottish footballer who plays as a defender for Brechin City. Spark has previously played for Dundee United, Dunfermline Athletic, Forfar Athletic, Berwick Rangers, Brechin City and Elgin City.

Early life
Spark was born in Dundee. He grew up in Edzell, Angus, and attended Mearns Academy.

Playing career

Dundee United
After being scouted by Dundee United, he joined the club's youth setup at the age of nine along with Ryan Gauld and John Souttar. Progressing through the various youth levels, Spark signed a professional contract with the club in July 2012. After impressing for the under-20 team, his contract was extended in November 2013 to run until May 2016. Spark made his competitive first team debut for Dundee United as a substitute in a Scottish Premiership match against St Mirren on 30 August 2014.

In February 2016, Spark moved on loan to Scottish League One side Forfar Athletic. He was released by Dundee United at the end of the 2015–16 season, following their relegation from the Scottish Premiership.

Dunfermline Athletic
After leaving Dundee United, Spark appeared as a trialist in three pre-season matches for Scottish Championship team Dunfermline Athletic before signing a one-year contract with them in July 2016. After playing for the Dunfermline development squad, he was loaned out for the remainder of the season to Scottish League Two club Berwick Rangers on 27 January 2017. Upon returning from his loan deal, Spark was subsequently released from Dunfermline after the club decided not to re-apply for the 2017–18 SPFL Development League.

Brechin City
Spark signed for Brechin City in June 2017. He left the club at the end of the 2018–19 season.

Elgin City
On 28 June 2019, Spark signed for Elgin City. On 4 May 2022, it was announced that Spark had left the club following the end of the 2021–22 season.

Brechin City (2nd spell) 
In May 2022, Spark signed a pre-contract agreement with Brechin City to join them for his second spell.

Career statistics

References

External links
 
 

Living people
1996 births
Footballers from Dundee
Scottish footballers
Association football defenders
Dundee United F.C. players
Forfar Athletic F.C. players
Dunfermline Athletic F.C. players
Berwick Rangers F.C. players
Scottish Professional Football League players
People educated at Brechin High School
Brechin City F.C. players
Footballers from Angus, Scotland
Elgin City F.C. players
Highland Football League players